The 2006 Pan American Trampoline and Tumbling Championships were held in Monterrey, Mexico, August 18–19, 2006.

Medalists

Medal table

References

2006 in gymnastics
International gymnastics competitions hosted by Mexico
2006 in Mexican sports
Pan American Gymnastics Championships